The 1990–91 Mississippi State Bulldogs men's basketball team represented Mississippi State University in the 1990–91 NCAA Division I men's basketball season. Led by head coach Richard Williams, the Bulldogs finished with a 20–9 record (13–5 SEC) and received an at-large bid to the NCAA tournament as No. 5 seed in the East region.

Roster

Schedule and results

|-
!colspan=9 style=| Non-conference regular season

|-
!colspan=9 style=| SEC Regular Season

|-
!colspan=9 style=| SEC Tournament

|-
!colspan=9 style=| NCAA Tournament

Sources

Rankings

References

Mississippi State
Mississippi State Bulldogs men's basketball seasons
Mississippi State